Rick Carter (born 1950, Los Angeles, California) is an American production designer and art director. He is best known for his collaborations with directors Steven Spielberg and Robert Zemeckis, particularly on the films Back to the Future Part II, Back to the Future Part III, Jurassic Park, Forrest Gump, [[The Polar Express (film)|The Polar Express]], War Horse, and Lincoln. He is also known for his work on James Cameron's Avatar, and for the J. J. Abrams-directed Star Wars films The Force Awakens and The Rise of Skywalker. He is a two-time winner of the Academy Award for Best Production Design for his work on Avatar and Lincoln. 

 Early life and education 
Carter's father was publicist, and later, motion picture producer, Dick Carter. His mother, Ruth, was a one-time Life magazine staffer, and later Realtor in Southern California.

Carter's student days at UCSC were spent painting. Participating in a film panel at 2011's "Bridging the Gap" Arts Division event, the former Art major joined then Arts Dean David Yager in revisiting his alma mater and reliving the unique experience of his UCSC days.

 Career 

 Beginnings 
A conscientious objector to the Vietnam War, he dropped out of the University of California at Berkeley and eventually entered the art department for the first time as an assistant on Hal Ashby’s Bound for Glory (1976) followed by James Bridges’ The China Syndrome (1979).

Film

His first credit as art director was with Ashby again on Second-Hand Hearts (1981), but art-directing The Goonies'' in 1985 was a pivotal job for the designer, as it led to another key meeting for Carter: with that film's writer and producer Steven Spielberg. The two hit it off and began a close working relationship that endures to the present day.

Filmography

Accolades

References

External links
 

1950 births
Living people
American art directors
American production designers
Best Art Direction Academy Award winners
Best Production Design BAFTA Award winners
People from Los Angeles